Pneumonia is an inflammatory condition of the lung in humans.

This may also refer to:
Pneumonia (non-human), the condition above but in animals
Pneumonia front, a rare meteorological phenomenon on western Lake Michigan
Pneumonia (album), an album by the alternative country band Whiskeytown

See also
Pneumonic (disambiguation)